The SSS islands, locally also known as the Windward Islands ( or ), is a collective term for the three territories of the Dutch Caribbean (formerly the Netherlands Antilles) that are located within the Leeward Islands group of the Lesser Antilles. In order of population size, they are: Sint Maarten, Sint Eustatius and Saba. In some contexts, the term is also used to refer to the entire island of Saint Martin (which also includes the Collectivity of Saint Martin), alongside Sint Eustatius and Saba.

The SSS islands were island territories of the Netherlands Antilles, until its dissolution in 2010. Since then, Sint Maarten is a  constituent country of the Kingdom of the Netherlands, while Sint Eustatius and Saba are special municipalities of the Netherlands. "SSS" is an acronym of the islands' names, and is analogous to the ABC, CAS and BES islands, which are other commonly used subdivisions of the Dutch Caribbean.

History
The island of Saint Martin was split between France and the Netherlands in 1648. The Dutch part, together with Sint Eustatius and Saba, became a single Dutch colony in 1815 as Sint Eustatius and Dependencies. In 1828, this colony was merged with the colonies Curaçao and Dependencies (the ABC islands) and Surinam, with Paramaribo as its capital. When this merger was partly reversed in 1845, the Dutch part of the SSS islands became part of Curaçao and Dependencies, with Willemstad as its capital. This colony became the Netherlands Antilles in 1954.

As part of the Netherlands Antilles, the SSS islands initially formed a single island territory as the Windward Islands. In 1983, it was split up into three separate island territories, with each a separate island council. After the dissolution of the Netherlands Antilles on 10 October 2010, Sint Eustatius and Saba became special municipalities of the Netherlands, while Sint Maarten became an independent country within the Kingdom of the Netherlands.

Composition

Political sense

Geographical sense

See also 
 Windward Islands People's Movement

References

Bibliography 
 

Dutch Caribbean
Former colonies of the Dutch Caribbean
Geography of the Dutch Caribbean
Geography of the Netherlands Antilles
Leeward Islands (Caribbean)